Marijn Ververs (born 17 September 1998) is a Dutch basketball player for ZZ Leiden of the Dutch Basketball League (DBL).

Professional career
Ververs, a product of the ZZ Leiden youth academy, made his professional debut with the senior team the 2016–17 season under coach Paul Vervaeck. In June 2020, Ververs signed a 2-year extension with Leiden. In the 2020–21 season, he was named captain of the team. In the 2020–21 season, he won his first DBL championship with Leiden.

On 14 June 2022, Ververs extended his contract with Leiden for three more seasons, until 2025.

National team career
In the summer of 2021, Ververs was selected for the 20-man preliminary team of the Netherlands national basketball team.
He played his first international match for the Orange Lions against Russia in Perm on 24 February 2022. Ververs was on the preliminary roster for EuroBasket 2022, but was cut from the team two days before the tournament during the final selection.

References

Living people
1998 births
B.S. Leiden players
Dutch Basketball League players
Dutch men's basketball players
ZZ Leiden players